Apsey Cove was formerly named Apsey Cove Point. It was a settlement in the "Trinity District". It was a fishing and farming settlement in 1911 with a population of 30.

See also
 List of ghost towns in Newfoundland and Labrador

Ghost towns in Newfoundland and Labrador